Sam Goi Seng Hui (Born 26 April 1949) is a Singaporean businessman who is also known as Singapore's "Popiah King". He is the chairman of Tee Yih Jia, a food manufacturing company, well known for selling spring roll pastry, or locally known as "popiah" skins,

In 2008, he was the largest single shareholder in Super Coffeemix. In 2014, he won the 2013 Businessman of the Year award at the Singapore Business Awards which were organised by local financial newspaper, The Business Times, and DHL Express.

Goi has four children. His youngest son, Ben Goi, served as chief operating officer of Tee Yih Jia until his death in 2019 from a stroke.

References

External links
 

1949 births
Living people
Singaporean businesspeople
Singaporean billionaires
People from Fuqing
Chinese emigrants to Singapore
Businesspeople from Fujian
Chinese company founders